The A535 road is a non-primary route in England that runs from Holmes Chapel, Cheshire to Alderley Edge, Cheshire. It passes through the Dane River valley. It is the main road that gives access to the Jodrell Bank Observatory and the Quinta Arboretum, planted by Sir Bernard Lovell in 1948.

History

In medieval times part of the existing A535 route provided access to Chorley Old Hall and moat near Alderley Edge, a Grade I listed building and scheduled monument. This part of the road is known as "Ryley's Lane". The original part of the house was built around 1330 by Robert de Chorley. The Stanley family carried out alterations around 1640 and built a bridge across the moat. Just past the hall, a lane leads off to the east which is named after the hall, Chorley Lane. In historical times, this lane leading off what is now the A535 road was the main road leading to Macclesfield from Alderley Hall, and was the continuation of the Macclesfield Road. This stretch is now the B5087 road. From the 16th to the 18th century, the Booth family were the major landowners in the southern part of the road in the Twemlow area. They built a grand mansion at Twemlow Hall in the area which can be viewed along the A535 road from Holmes Chapel to Goostrey on a hill top.

In 1831, Corbishley Bridge was erected along the road to the northeast of Chelford, to the west of the hamlet of Corbishley to facilitate the railway line. In 1898, the Cheshire County Council erected a signpost near Withington Hall along the road.

From September 1952, the road became the main road of transport of shifting building materials for the building of the Jodrell Bank Observatory. The first major constructional work was completed in the summer of 1957, and eventually five telescopes were installed at the centre under the guidance of Sir Bernard Lovell. Lovell acknowledged that delivering the telescope parts over the level crossing along the A535 may have been problematic but he didn't anticipate any major difficulties. Jodrell Bank Observatory has since become the main tourist attraction of the area.

During the summer of 2010, the construction of the A34 Alderley Bypass affected the road network in the area and meant that as one road was closed off, traffic had to frequently be diverted. The road used to connect to the A34 at a junction in Alderley Edge, but with the opening of the A34 Alderley Bypass in November 2010, the A535 now terminates at the roundabout on the A537 in Chelford. The part of the A535 from the Chelford roundabout to Alderley Edge was joined with the section of the old A34 from Alderley Edge to the Whitehall Bridge roundabout and renamed B5359.

Route

It passes the village of Twemlow Green, running alongside the Twemlow Viaduct. After the gentle climb out of Twemlow, the Lovell Telescope of Jodrell Bank is in view, with access to the site being from a sharp left turn into Bomish Lane. At Jodrell Bank is a road leading off to the east which is initially called Farm Lane, leading to Lower Withington. This is part of the B5392 road which eventually joins the A537 at Broken Cross in the western suburbs of Macclesfield.

After passing through the village of Withington Green, a lane passes off the east called Catch Penny lane which leads to Deans Rough Farm and a Catch Penny lake. Further north is Farm Wood Quarry on its left, an area which the road passes which has had several notable geological examinations conducted into it.

The road continues to past Astle Hall, site of the annual 1000 Engine Rally in June, and also the Astle Park Steam Rally (at Astle Park) in August, to Chelford, where it terminates at the A537 roundabout.
Originally the A535 continued from the roundabout on the A537 towards Alderley Edge, but this section of the A535 was downgraded and renamed B5359 following the opening of the new A34 bypass in 2010. Shortly after leaving Chelford the B5359 passes under the Crewe to Manchester line at Corbishley Bridge, and continues through the village of Alderley Edge and finally ends at the Whitehall Bridge roundabout on the new A34.

References 

Roads in England
Roads in Cheshire
Scenic routes in the United Kingdom